Behzad Dadashzadeh, born June 22, 1971, is a retired Iranian football player and now manager. He was a midfielder for a number of clubs, most notably Persepolis F.C.  and Esteghlal F.C. as well as the Iran national football team.

Club career 
Dadashzadeh started his club career with Esteghlal Rasht F.C. and then Persepolis F.C. and also played for Payam Mashhad F.C., Zob Ahan F.C., Esteghlal F.C. and Bargh Shiraz F.C. and Azarbijan Tehran

International career 
He played for Iran national team in 1994 World Cup Qualification round, 1994 Asian Games and 2006 FIFA Beach Soccer World Cup and AFC Beach Soccer Championship.

Coaching career 
He was one of the coaches of Iran national beach soccer team in 2006 FIFA Beach Soccer, 2007 FIFA Beach Soccer and then again in 2008 FIFA Beach Soccer World Cup. He was re-appointed in January 2010.
He was also assistant coach of Damash Gilan F.C. in 2009–10 Azadegan League.

Honors

Iran 
AFC Asian Cup
 1992, Group Stage
Asian Games
1994 Asian Games Group Stage

Persepolis FC 
Asian Cup Winners' Cup
1992–93 Runner-up
Azadegan League
1992 Runner-up
1993 Runner-up
1995–96 Champions

Esteghlal FC 
Iran Pro League
2001–2002 Runner-up
Azadegan League
1999–2000 Runner-up
2000–2001 Champions
Hazfi Cup
1999–2000 Champions
2001–2002 Champions

External links 
Behzad Dadashzadeh stats on FIFA

World Cup 94 Campaign Team Melli
Kayhan Publishing, Special Edition 30 Years of History of Persepolis F.C., From Shahin to Piroozi

1971 births
Association football midfielders
Iran international footballers
Iranian football managers
Iranian footballers
Esteghlal F.C. players
Payam Mashhad players
Bargh Shiraz players
Living people
Persepolis F.C. players
Azadegan League players
Footballers at the 1994 Asian Games
Asian Games competitors for Iran
People from Rasht
Sportspeople from Gilan province
20th-century Iranian people